This is a list of the breeds of ass or donkey considered in France to be of French origin.

Recognised breeds
 Baudet du Poitou
 Bourbonnais Donkey
 Cotentin Donkey
 Grand Noir du Berry
 Norman donkey
 Provence donkey
 Pyrenean donkey

Minor and extinct breeds
 Petit Gris du Berry

References

 
Donkey